Stefan Karadzha is a village in the municipality of Dobrichka, in Dobrich Province, in northeastern Bulgaria. The population is around 290 people.

References

Villages in Dobrich Province